Ghosts Will Come and Kiss Our Eyes is the third album by Canadian band Hrsta. It was released on September 10, 2007, by Constellation Records. Its catalogue number is CST048.

Track listing
All tracks written by Hrsta, except where noted.

Personnel
Mike Moya – guitar, organ, effects, voice
Brooke Crouser – guitar, organs, effects
Harris Newman – bass guitar
Eric Craven – drums

References

External links
Release info on Constellation Records

2007 albums
Hrsta albums
Constellation Records (Canada) albums